The Oro Grande School district is located in the town of Oro Grande, California.  

Oro Grande School District is composed of four schools, three of which are charter schools or academies that take in students from outside the district. 

Oro Grande Elementary School serves grades Kindergarten through six in a college preparatory setting.  It is the only non-charter school.

Riverside Preparatory School which serves grades Kindergarten through grade eleven (grade 12 to be added in 2009–2010) in a high academic college preparatory program. Mojave River Academy serves grades Kindergarten through grade twelve in an Independent Study program. Sedona Charter Academy serving grades Kindergarten through grade twelve in an Independent Study program.

References

External links
 

School districts in San Bernardino County, California